Mauricio Martín Romero (born January 13, 1983 in La Pampa) is a former  Argentine football defender and current manager. He also holds Mexican citizenship.

Career

Club career
Romero was captain of Morelia from the Clausura 2009 until the Apertura 2010 when Jaime Lozano was named captain. His last club was Club Agropecuario Argentino in the Primera B Nacional.

International career
He capped for Argentina Under-20 team at 2003 FIFA World Youth Championship.

Managerial career
After becoming assistant manager for a season starting in 2019, he became manager in August 2021 for CA Ferro Carril Oeste General Pico.

On 2 November 2021 during a third division away match against Huracan Las Heras at 1-3 in the 34 minute, whilst managing CA Ferro Carril Oeste General Pico he was shot in the shoulder.

References

External links
 
Guardian statistics
 Argentine Primera statistics
Mauricio Romero at Soccerway

1983 births
Living people
Argentine footballers
Argentina under-20 international footballers
Argentine expatriate footballers
Club Atlético Lanús footballers
Club Atlético Colón footballers
Atlético Morelia players
Atlante F.C. footballers
Club Puebla players
Dorados de Sinaloa footballers
Club de Gimnasia y Esgrima La Plata footballers
Argentine Primera División players
Liga MX players
Expatriate footballers in Mexico
Association football defenders
Naturalized citizens of Mexico
People from General Pico